May 2022 Afghanistan explosions may refer to:

2022 Mazar-i-Sharif minivan bombings
May 2022 Kabul mosque bombing